Tughan-e Baba Gorgor (also Romanized as Ţūghān-e Bābā Gorgor and Ţūghān-e Bābā Gor Gor; also known as Toghān, Tooghan Jadid, Ţowghān, Towghān-e Jadīd, and Ţūghān) is a village in Delbaran Rural District, in the Central District of Qorveh County, Kurdistan Province, Iran. At the 2006 census, its population was 676, in 160 families. The village is populated by Azerbaijanis and Kurds.

References 

Towns and villages in Qorveh County
Kurdish settlements in Kurdistan Province
Azerbaijani settlements in Kurdistan Province